Mesh-He is the 10th lugal of the first dynasty of Uruk. He ruled in modern-day Mesopotamia. Little is known about Mesh-he.

The Sumerian King List puts him after En-Nun-Tarah-Ana and assigns 36 years of reign, it is believed he died by the year 2552 BC. He was followed by Melem-ana.

His historicity, and that of his successors, however, is not completely established.

References

See also

|-

Sumerian kings
26th-century BC Sumerian kings
Kings of Uruk
26th-century BC deaths